Clostebol acetate (BAN) (brand names Macrobin, Steranabol, Alfa-Trofodermin, Megagrisevit), also known as 4-chlorotestosterone 17β-acetate (4-CLTA) or as 4-chloroandrost-4-en-17β-ol-3-one 17β-acetate, is a synthetic, injected anabolic-androgenic steroid (AAS) and a derivative of testosterone that is marketed in Germany and Italy. It is an androgen ester – specifically, the C17β acetate ester of clostebol (4-chlorotestosterone) – and acts as a prodrug of clostebol in the body. Clostebol acetate is administered via intramuscular injection.

See also
 Clostebol caproate
 Clostebol propionate
 Norclostebol
 Norclostebol acetate
 Oxabolone
 Oxabolone cipionate

References

Acetate esters
Androgen esters
Androgens and anabolic steroids
Androstanes
Organochlorides
Prodrugs
World Anti-Doping Agency prohibited substances